Ubiquitin specific protease 4 (USP4) is an enzyme that cleaves ubiquitin from a number of protein substrates. Prior to the standardization of nomenclature USP4 was known as UNP, and was one of the first deubiquitinating enzymes to be identified in mammals.  In the mouse and human the USP4 protein is encoded by a gene containing 22 exons.

This protein is a member of cysteine peptidase family C19.  As a deubiquitinating enzyme it is unusual in having the capacity to cleave ubiquitin-proline bonds. This property may reflect structural flexibility in the active site of the enzyme, and may explain its ability to cleave ubiquitin chains of various linkages.  USP4 has substrates of important function in a number of cell signalling pathways, including the NF-κB, TGF-β, Wnt/β-catenin, p53, and spliceosome pathways.  Other substrates include the adenosine A2A receptor and the Ro52 (TRIM21) protein.

USP4 is a nucleocytoplasmic shuttling protein that bears a functional nuclear localization signal (NLS) 766QPQKKKK772  and a nuclear export signal (NES) 133VEVYLLELKL142. Those signals initiate the translocation of USP4 to the nucleus from the cytoplasm and vice versa, respectively. The proportion of cytoplasmic to nuclear USP4 pool varies depending on the cell type, the phase of cell cycle and the level of protein expression.

Interactions
USP4 has been shown to interact with the tumor suppressor pRb protein and the pocket-related proteins p107  and p130.

References

Further reading

External links